"Boys" is a song recorded by Canadian country artist Dean Brody and American country artist Mickey Guyton. The song was written by Emily Reid, Matt McVaney, and Travis Wood. It was the third single from Brody's seventh studio album Boys.

Background and content
The song is about the difference between how men and boys behave in a relationship. Brody remarked that he was excited to have Guyton's "incredible vocals" on the track.

Critical reception
"Boys" received generally positive reviews, with several outfits praising Mickey Guyton's presence on the song. The Reviews Are In called the song a "wonderful and beautifully sung duet" giving it an A+ and saying "the addition of Mickey Guyton's voice is fantastic". Kerry Doole of FYI Music News referred to the track as a "reflective and philosophical ballad that [Brody] delivers convincingly" adding that "the vocal contribution of Guyton gives it extra resonance". The British Columbia Music Association described the song as a "truly outstanding offering".

Commercial performance
"Boys" reached a peak of number 1 on Billboard Canada Country chart on April 3, 2021. It was Brody's sixth number-one hit, and Guyton's first-ever number one on any chart, as well as her highest-charting song on Canada Country. She also became the first black woman to top the Canada Country chart. It peaked at number 65 on the Canadian Hot 100, marking Guyton's first entry on that chart. The song has been certified Gold by Music Canada.

Charts

Certifications

Notes

References

2020 songs
2020 singles
Dean Brody songs
Mickey Guyton songs
Male–female vocal duets
Country ballads
Songs written by Travis Wood (songwriter)
Song recordings produced by Todd Clark